Cottondale is a ghost town located in Sunflower County, Mississippi.

References

Geography of Sunflower County, Mississippi
Unincorporated communities in Mississippi